The Best First Documentary Feature is one of the annual Critics' Choice Documentary Awards. It is usually given to the director (or directors). The "first feature" designation is applied to the director.

Winners and nominees

2010s

2020s

References

External links
Official website

Best First Documentary Feature
Directorial debut film awards
Awards established in 2016